The Sohodol is a right tributary of the river Arieș in Romania. It discharges into the Arieș in Gura Sohodol.

References

Rivers of Romania
Rivers of Alba County